Bartazoon is a genus of parasitic alveolates in the phylum Apicomplexa.

History

This genus was created by Karadjian, Chavatte & Landau in 2015.

This genus is named after John R Barta of the University of Guelph, Canada.

Taxonomy

There is one species in this genus currently – Bartazoon breinli. This species was previously known as Hepatozoon breinli.

This genus is related to the genus Hemolivia.

Description

The type species for this genus is Bartazoon breinli. This species was described in 1960 by Mackerras.

The type host of the type species is Varanus tristis orientalis.

The type host was described in Innisfail, Queensland, Australia.

The species in this genus infect reptiles, amphibians, birds and rodents.

They are transmitted by biting insects.

The gamonts undergo syzygy.

This is followed by microgametogenesis with production of a small number of gametes within a common envelope along with the macrogamete.

Sporogony occurs in a single step.

Sporocyst development occurs inside the oocyst envelope.

References

Apicomplexa genera